Jessica James is an American author of suspense, historical fiction, and military fiction ranging from the Revolutionary War to modern day.

She is a three-time winner of the John Esten Cooke Award for Southern Fiction and was featured in the book 50 Great Writers You Should Be Reading published in 2010. Her novels are featured in library collections throughout the United States including Harvard University and the U.S. Naval Academy.

James is a graduate of Shippensburg University of Pennsylvania and resides in Gettysburg, Pennsylvania. She is a member of the Military Writers Society of America, the Independent Book Publishers Association, and Novelists, Inc (NINC). James is also a member of the American Legion Post 202 Auxiliary, Gettysburg.

James shares her historical research and travels on her blog Past Lane Travels.

Books

Awards
 John Esten Cooke Award for Southern Fiction (2012, 2014, 2019)
 Indie Excellence Award Finalist (2018)
 Silver Falchion Award Finalist in Best Suspense (2018)
 B.R.A.G. Medallion Honoree (2017)
 Gold Medal – Military Writers Society of America (2016)
 Bronze Medal (Romance/Suspense) – Readers’ Favorite International Book Awards (2016)
 Book of the Year Finalist (War & Military) – Foreword Magazine (2015)
 NJRW Golden Leaf Award (2015)
 Valley Forge Romance Writers Sheila Award Finalist (2014)
 Reader's Crown Award Finalist (2014) 
 "Best Books 2013" Finalist (Fiction/Religious) – USA Book News (2013)
 Bronze Winner: Book of the Year – Foreword Magazine (2012)
 "Best Books 2011" Finalist (Historical Fiction) – USA Book News (2011)
 Best Regional Fiction – Next Generation Indie Awards (2011)
 Pinnacle Book Achievement Award – North American Bookdealers Exchange (2011)
 Military Writers Society Award in Historical Fiction (2010)
 HOLT Medallion Finalist for Best Southern Theme – Virginia Romance Writers (2009)
 Best Regional Fiction – Next Generation Indie Awards (2008)
 Silver Award (Best Regional Fiction) – Independent Publisher Book Awards (2008)
 Book of the Year Finalist (Romance) – Foreword Magazine (2008)

References

External links
 
 History and Travel Website

Living people
Women military writers
American military writers
American women non-fiction writers
Year of birth missing (living people)
21st-century American women